Mingo County Schools is the operating school district within Mingo County, West Virginia. It is governed by the Mingo County Board of Education.

Schools

High schools

Mingo Central High School 
Tug Valley High School

PK-8 schools
Burch PK-8 School
Kermit PK-8 School
Lenore PK-8 School
Matewan PK-8 School
Williamson PK-8 School

Middle schools
Gilbert Middle School

Elementary schools
Dingess Elementary School
Gilbert Elementary School

External links

Mingo County Schools

School districts in West Virginia
Education in Mingo County, West Virginia